Chlorophyllide a reductase, also known as COR, is an enzyme with systematic name bacteriochlorophyllide-a:ferredoxin 7,8-oxidoreductase.  It catalyses the following chemical reaction
chlorophyllide a + 2 reduced ferredoxin + ATP + H2O + 2 H+  3-deacetyl 3-vinylbacteriochlorophyllide a + 2 oxidized ferredoxin + ADP + phosphate

This reduction (with trans stereochemistry) of the pyrrole ring B, gives the characteristic 18-electron aromatic system that distinguishes bacteriochlorophylls from chlorophylls, which retain the chlorin system of Chlorophyllide a.
This enzyme is present in purple bacteria such as Rhodobacter capsulatus and Rhodobacter sphaeroides, and Pseudomonadota. It is a component of the biosynthetic pathway to bacteriochlorophylls.

See also 
 Biosynthesis of bacteriochlorophylls

References 

EC 1.3.7